Lists of Indian actors cover actors from India, who portray characters in the theater, film, radio, or television.
The lists are organized by medium, language and type of actor.

By medium
 List of Indian male film actors
 List of Indian film actresses
 List of Indian television actors
 List of Indian television actresses

By language
 List of Bengali actresses
 List of Bhojpuri actors
 List of Bhojpuri actresses
 List of Hindi film actors
 List of Hindi film actresses
 List of Hindi television actresses
 List of Kannada film actresses
 List of Malayalam male actors
 List of Malayalam actresses
 List of Marathi film actors
 List of Marathi film actresses
 List of actors of Tamil origin
 List of Tamil film actors
 List of Tamil film actresses
 List of Telugu film actors
 List of Telugu film actresses

Type of actor

 List of Indian child actors
 List of Indian comedians
 List of singing actors in Indian cinema